Delta is the fourth studio album by British folk rock band Mumford & Sons. It was released on 16 November 2018 through Gentlemen of the Road, Island Records and Glassnote. The album was recorded at The Church Studios in London with producer Paul Epworth. The album was supported by three singles, "Guiding Light", "Beloved", and "Woman", and managed to reach number one on the US Billboard 200 and number two on the UK Albums Chart. Delta was their last album with guitarist and banjoist Winston Marshall before his departure in 2021.

Recording
The band recorded more than 25 songs with Paul Epworth at The Church Studios, and were intent on keeping the "collaborative spirit" of their live shows and 2016 EP Johannesburg. Marcus Mumford has said that much of the album was recorded in "non-gender specific Friday night lads sessions" with friends where they would play music, "smoke cigarettes and have a great time". Around 100 people were involved in these sessions, with some being featured on the record, including American singer-songwriters Maggie Rogers and Gill Landry.

Music and themes
Delta has been called an album that "draw[s] on the shared experience of being on and off" tour, and distinct from the band's "anthemic" previous album, 2015's Wilder Mind, in that it is more "tender", "introspective and reflective". It incorporates elements of electronica, rap and jazz. It has been said to still contain the "intimacy and jubilance" that the band is known for, but keyboard player Ben Lovett said it is also concerned with "the four Ds: death, divorce, drugs and depression". Mumford spoke to Annie Mac about reusing folk instruments they did not use on Wilder Mind but being "conscious [about] how we can make these instruments sound not like these instruments which opened up a whole new world for us".

Larry Fritzmaurice of Pitchfork compared the album to pop acts Imagine Dragons and Twenty One Pilots, while heavily comparing the album's length and structure to British rock band Coldplay's album X&Y, noting they both share an "imposing length". Piper Westrom of Riff Magazine stated that, in contrast to Wilder Minds rock-oriented sound, Delta is a pop album.

Promotion

Singles
On 20 September 2018, the band released the lead single, "Guiding Light", followed by "If I Say", a promotional single on 25 October 2018. On 22 February 2019, "Beloved" was released as the album's second single, followed shortly after by an accompanying music video. "Woman" was released as the album's third and final single on 10 May 2019. Following the initial album cycle, the band released "Blind Leading the Blind", a song recorded during the Delta sessions but was not included on the final release. During the COVID-19 pandemic, the band released an early demo of the track "Forever", titled "Forever (Garage Version)", on 8 May 2020.

Tour and Live EP

The band embarked on the Delta Tour in promotion of the album, which began in November 2018. To commemorate the end of the tour, which was cut short by the COVID-19 pandemic, the band released a six-track live EP titled The Delta Tour EP, which consisted of various live recordings from the tour. The release included live covers of "Hurt" by Nine Inch Nails,  "Blood" by the Middle East, and "With a Little Help from My Friends" by the Beatles. Featured guest artists included Gang of Youths and the Milk Carton Kids.

Critical reception

Delta received mixed reviews from music critics. At Metacritic, which assigns a normalised rating out of 100 to reviews from mainstream critics, the album received an average score of 59, based on 18 reviews.

Commercial performance
Delta debuted at number one on the US Billboard 200 with 237,000 album-equivalent units, including 214,000 pure album sales. It is Mumford & Sons' third US number-one album. It was beaten to the top spot in the UK by Michael Bublé's Love.

Track listing
All songs written and performed by Mumford & Sons.

Charts

Weekly charts

Year-end charts

Certifications

References

2018 albums
Mumford & Sons albums
Albums produced by Paul Epworth
Albums recorded at The Church Studios